List of Western Australian swimmers who have won a medal at the Summer Olympic Games or Summer Paralympic Games. Most athletes have been inducted into Swimming WA Hall of Fame.

See also
Sport in Western Australia
Swimming in Australia
List of Australian Olympic medallists in swimming

References

West
swimming